The 55th parallel north is a circle of latitude that is 55 degrees north of the Earth's equatorial plane. It crosses Europe, Asia, the Pacific Ocean, North America, and the Atlantic Ocean.

At this latitude the sun is visible for 17 hours, 22 minutes during the summer solstice and 7 hours, 10 minutes during the winter solstice.

This latitude also roughly corresponds to the minimum latitude in which nautical twilight can last all night near the summer solstice.

Around the world
Starting at the Prime Meridian and heading eastwards, the parallel 55° north passes through:

{| class="wikitable plainrowheaders"
! scope="col" width="125" | Co-ordinates
! scope="col" | Country, territory or sea
! scope="col" | Notes
|-
| style="background:#b0e0e6;" | 
! scope="row" style="background:#b0e0e6;" | North Sea
| style="background:#b0e0e6;" |
|-
| 
! scope="row" |  
| Island of Sylt, close to Germany's northernmost point
|-
| style="background:#b0e0e6;" | 
! scope="row" style="background:#b0e0e6;" | Wadden Sea
| style="background:#b0e0e6;" |
|-
| 
! scope="row" | 
| Jutland (mainland) and the island of Als
|-
| style="background:#b0e0e6;" | 
! scope="row" style="background:#b0e0e6;" | Little Belt
| style="background:#b0e0e6;" |
|-
| 
! scope="row" | 
| Islands of Skarø, Tåsinge and Langeland
|-
| style="background:#b0e0e6;" | 
! scope="row" style="background:#b0e0e6;" | Great Belt
| style="background:#b0e0e6;" |
|-
| style="background:#b0e0e6;" | 
! scope="row" style="background:#b0e0e6;" | Smålandsfarvandet
| style="background:#b0e0e6;" |
|-
| 
! scope="row" | 
| Islands of Sjælland and Møn
|-
| style="background:#b0e0e6;" | 
! scope="row" style="background:#b0e0e6;" | Baltic Sea
| style="background:#b0e0e6;" |
|-
| 
! scope="row" | 
| Island of Bornholm. There is a small memorial at 
|-
| style="background:#b0e0e6;" | 
! scope="row" style="background:#b0e0e6;" | Baltic Sea
| style="background:#b0e0e6;" |
|-
| 
! scope="row" | 
| Kaliningrad Oblast - passing through the Curonian Lagoon
|-
| 
! scope="row" | 
| Marijampolė County
|-
| 
! scope="row" | 
| Vitebsk Region
|-
| 
! scope="row" | 
| Smolensk Oblast
|-
| 
! scope="row" | 
| North Kazakhstan Region
|-
| 
! scope="row" | 
| Passing just north of Omsk at Passing just south of Novosibirsk at 
|-
| style="background:#b0e0e6;" | 
! scope="row" style="background:#b0e0e6;" | Sea of Okhotsk
| style="background:#b0e0e6;" |
|-
| 
! scope="row" | 
| Feklistova Island
|-
| style="background:#b0e0e6;" | 
! scope="row" style="background:#b0e0e6;" | Sea of Okhotsk
| style="background:#b0e0e6;" |
|-
| 
! scope="row" | 
| Bolshoy Shantar Island
|-
| style="background:#b0e0e6;" | 
! scope="row" style="background:#b0e0e6;" | Sea of Okhotsk
| style="background:#b0e0e6;" |
|-
| 
! scope="row" |  
| Kamchatka Peninsula
|-
| style="background:#b0e0e6;" | 
! scope="row" style="background:#b0e0e6;" | Pacific Ocean
| style="background:#b0e0e6;" |
|-
| 
! scope="row" |  
| Bering Island
|-
| style="background:#b0e0e6;" | 
! scope="row" style="background:#b0e0e6;" | Bering Sea
| style="background:#b0e0e6;" | Passing just north of Medny Island, 
|-
| 
! scope="row" | 
| Alaska - Unimak Island and the Alaska Peninsula
|-valign="top"
| style="background:#b0e0e6;" | 
! scope="row" style="background:#b0e0e6;" | Pacific Ocean
| style="background:#b0e0e6;" | Gulf of Alaska - passing just south of Dolgoi Island and Unga Island, Alaska, 
|-
| 
! scope="row" | 
| Alaska - Nagai Island
|-
| style="background:#b0e0e6;" | 
! scope="row" style="background:#b0e0e6;" | Pacific Ocean
| style="background:#b0e0e6;" | Gulf of Alaska
|-
| 
! scope="row" | 
| Alaska - Little Koniuji Island
|-
| style="background:#b0e0e6;" | 
! scope="row" style="background:#b0e0e6;" | Pacific Ocean
| style="background:#b0e0e6;" | Gulf of Alaska
|-valign="top"
| 
! scope="row" | 
| Alaska - Dall Island, Sukkwan Island and Prince of Wales Island
|-
| style="background:#b0e0e6;" | 
! scope="row" style="background:#b0e0e6;" | Clarence Strait
| style="background:#b0e0e6;" |
|-
| 
! scope="row" | 
| Alaska - Annette Island and Duke Island
|-
| style="background:#b0e0e6;" | 
! scope="row" style="background:#b0e0e6;" | Revillagigedo Channel
| style="background:#b0e0e6;" |
|-
| 
! scope="row" | 
| Alaska - Alaska Panhandle
|-valign="top"
| 
! scope="row" | 
| British Columbia - Pearse Island and the mainland Alberta Saskatchewan Manitoba Ontario
|-
| style="background:#b0e0e6;" | 
! scope="row" style="background:#b0e0e6;" | Hudson Bay
| style="background:#b0e0e6;" |
|-valign="top"
| 
! scope="row" | 
| Quebec Newfoundland and Labrador - for about 12 km Quebec Newfoundland and Labrador - for about 5 km Quebec - for about 3 km Newfoundland and Labrador Quebec Newfoundland and Labrador - mainland and the Adlavik Islands
|-
| style="background:#b0e0e6;" | 
! scope="row" style="background:#b0e0e6;" | Atlantic Ocean
| style="background:#b0e0e6;" |
|-
| 
! scope="row" | 
| Island of Arranmore and mainland
|-
| 
! scope="row" | 
| Northern Ireland (passing through the city of Derry)
|-
| style="background:#b0e0e6;" | 
! scope="row" style="background:#b0e0e6;" | North Channel
| style="background:#b0e0e6;" |
|-valign="top"
| 
! scope="row" | 
| Scotland (passing through Gretna) England (passing through the Newcastle upon Tyne urban area)
|-
| style="background:#b0e0e6;" | 
! scope="row" style="background:#b0e0e6;" | North Sea
| style="background:#b0e0e6;" |
|}

Notable cities and towns on 55°N
Chelyabinsk, Chelyabinsk Oblast, Russia
Omsk, Omsk Oblast, Russia
Novosibirsk, Novosibirsk Oblast, Russia
Derry, Northern Ireland, UK
Newcastle upon Tyne, England, UK
South Shields, England, UK.
Thompson, Manitoba, CA
Grande Prairie, Alberta, Canada

Use as a boundary
The 55th parallel serves as the southern boundary of Nunavik territory in Quebec.

See also
54th parallel north
56th parallel north
Parallel 54°40′ north

References

n55
Borders of Quebec
Borders of Newfoundland and Labrador